General Sir James Frederick Noel Birch  (29 December 1865 – 3 February 1939) was a British Royal Artillery officer during the Second Boer War and World War I and subsequently Master-General of the Ordnance. The Birch gun was named after him.

Military career
Birch was the second son of Major Richard Birch and was born at Llanrhaiadr, Denbighshire and educated at Giggleswick School, Marlborough College and the Royal Military Academy, Woolwich. He was commissioned into the Royal Horse Artillery in 1885. In 1895 to 1896 he took part in the Ashanti expedition, and in South Africa he served with the Royal Horse Artillery in the Cavalry Division under the command of Sir John French, taking part in the relief of Kimberley, the operations in the Orange Free State and the Transvaal, and being present at the Battle of Diamond Hill. He was promoted major in June 1900, and served in Cape Colony the following year. In January 1902 he received the temporary rank of lieutenant-colonel when he was given command of the 30th battalion of the Imperial Yeomanry, which left Southampton for South Africa four months later. They arrived in early May, shortly after conclusion of hostilities, and he left for home again with the battalion in December 1902.

Birch was in command of the Riding Establishment at Woolwich from 1905 to 1907. In 1912 he was promoted to the substantive rank of lieutenant colonel and commanded the 7th brigade, Royal Horse Artillery.

Birch went with his brigade to France in August 1914, serving under the command of Sir Edmund Allenby, in the retreat from Mons and in the battle of the Aisne and Ypres-Armentières. In January 1915 he was appointed brigadier-general on the general staff of the Cavalry Corps, and a few months later C.R.A. of the 7th division going in the same position in July to the I Corps, then commanded by Sir Douglas Haig. In May 1916 Haig brought him to general headquarters as artillery adviser, a post he held until the end of the war. He was promoted lieutenant-general in 1919 when he was made a colonel commandant of the Royal Artillery.

In 1920, he became director of remounts at the War Office. In the following year he was appointed director-general of the Territorial Army and the development of cadet corps. In 1923 he became colonel commandant of the Royal Horse Artillery, and in the same year he was appointed Master-General of the Ordnance, a post he held until 1927. He was promoted general in 1926 and retired from the army in the following year to become a director of Vickers-Armstrong.

Birch married Florence Hyacynthe Chetwode (1876–1938) the third daughter of Sir George Chetwode and Alice Jane Bass, and sister of Philip Chetwode, 1st Baron Chetwode.

Birch died on 3 February 1939 at Kings College Hospital, London aged 73.

Publications
 Modern Riding (1909)
 Modern Riding and Horse Education (1912)

References
 Who's Who
 The Times, Obituaries February 1939

1865 births
1939 deaths
British military personnel of the Fourth Anglo-Ashanti War
British Army personnel of the Second Boer War
Royal Horse Artillery officers
British Army generals of World War I
Knights Grand Cross of the Order of the British Empire
Knights Commander of the Order of the Bath
Knights Commander of the Order of St Michael and St George
People educated at Giggleswick School
Military personnel from Denbighshire
People educated at Marlborough College
Graduates of the Royal Military Academy, Woolwich
Imperial Yeomanry officers